Edgewater Estates is a census-designated place (CDP) in San Patricio County, Texas, United States. The population was 72 at the 2010 census. Prior to the 2010 census Edgewater Estates was part of the Edgewater-Paisano CDP.

Geography
Edgewater Estates is located at  (28.096882, -97.864972).

References

Census-designated places in San Patricio County, Texas
Census-designated places in Texas
Corpus Christi metropolitan area